Marija Kessler (April 24, 1860 – May 1, 1939), was a Slovene socialite. Her salon was the cultural center of artist life in Ljubljana in the late 19th century, and was regarded as the most notable example of a salon in Slovenia.

She was the mother of the poet Vera Albreht, and the mother-in-law of the poets Fran Albreht and Oton Župančič.

Sources
Vladimir Klemenčič (ed.): Obdobje socialnega realizma v slovenskem jeziku, književnosti in kulturi. Ljubljana 1987, p. 128.

1860 births
1939 deaths
19th-century Carniolan people
Slovenian salon-holders
People from Ljubljana